Oșorhei is a commune in Bihor County, Crișana, Romania with a population of 6,532 people. It is composed of five villages: Alparea (Váradalpár), Cheriu (Alkér), Felcheriu (Felkér), Fughiu (Fugyi) and Oșorhei.

References

Communes in Bihor County
Localities in Crișana